Jan Karol Czolański (died 10 Nov 1664) was a Roman Catholic prelate who served as Auxiliary Bishop of Lutsk (1662–1664)

Biography
On 5 Jun 1662, Jan Karol Czolański was appointed during the papacy of Pope Alexander VII as Auxiliary Bishop of Lutsk and Titular Bishop of Orthosias in Caria. He served as Auxiliary Bishop of Lutsk until his death on 10 Nov 1664.

References

External links and additional sources
 (for Chronology of Bishops) 
 (for Chronology of Bishops)  

17th-century Roman Catholic bishops in the Polish–Lithuanian Commonwealth
Bishops appointed by Pope Alexander VII
1664 deaths